The CIK-FIA Karting European Championship is a kart racing competition organised by the CIK-FIA. Its inaugural season took place in 1972. Today, the series holds championships in four karting categories: KZ, KF2, OK and OKJ. Notable champions have been Alex Zanardi, Jos Verstappen, Giorgio Pantano, Jarno Trulli, Sébastien Buemi, Alexander Albon, George Russell, Lando Norris and Formula One World Champions Jenson Button, Sebastian Vettel, Lewis Hamilton, and Max Verstappen.

FIA Karting European Champions (Direct Drive & Primary Category)

KZ2 - Category European Champions

Junior European Champions & Junior Class European Champions 

(*) indicates the years the Junior World Championships were also held in the Junior class

Formula Super A European Champions

See also 

 Karting World Championship

References

External links 

 CIK-FIA – International Karting Governing Body
 1990 – 2009 CIK Results

European auto racing series
Kart racing series
Recurring sporting events established in 1972